Rhenium pentachloride is an inorganic compound of chlorine and rhenium.  The compound has the formula Re2Cl10 but it is usually referred to as rhenium pentachloride. It is a red-brown  solid.

Structure and preparation
Rhenium pentachloride has a bioctahedral structure and can be formulated as Cl4Re(μ-Cl)2ReCl4.  The Re-Re distance is 3.74 Å. The motif is similar to that seen for tantalum pentachloride.

This compound was first prepared in 1933, a few years after the discovery of rhenium. The preparation involves chlorination of rhenium at temperatures up to 900 °C. The material can be purified by sublimation.

ReCl5 is one of the most oxidized binary chlorides of Re.  It does not undergo further chlorination.  ReCl6 has been prepared from rhenium hexafluoride.   Rhenium heptafluoride is known but not the heptachloride.

Uses and reactions
It degrades in air to a brown liquid.

Although rhenium pentachloride has no commercial applications, it is of historic significance as one of the early catalysts for olefin metathesis. Reduction gives trirhenium nonachloride.

Oxygenation affords the Re(VII) oxychloride:
ReCl5  +  3 Cl2O  →   ReO3Cl  +  5 Cl2

Comproportionation of the penta- and trichloride gives rhenium tetrachloride.

References

External links
Rhenium Chloride information at webelements

Rhenium compounds
Chlorides
Metal halides
Substances discovered in the 1930s